is a 2007 Japanese movie directed by Yoshimitsu Morita and starring Toyokawa Etsushi and Yūki Amami. Based on the novel of the same name by Hideo Okuda, it tells the story of a schoolboy whose family moves from Tokyo to Okinawa.

It began filming in May 2007 in Tokyo; the crew went to Okinawa for on-location filming at the end of June. Its theme song is "Eien no Uta" by Nakashima Mika.

Cast 
 Etsushi Toyokawa as 'Ichiro Uehara' (as a father who was an extremism activist)
 Yūki Amami as 'Sakura Uehara' (as a mother who was an extremism activist)
 Keiko Kitagawa as 'Yoko Uehara' (as a Sakura's daughter)
 Shuto Tanabe as 'Jiro Uehara' (as a Eldest son. 6th grade schoolboy. This movie's protagonist)
 Rina Matsumoto as 'Momoko Uehara' (as a Second daughter. 4th grade schoolgirl. She loves being bitten by her father)

 Ken'ichi Matsuyama as Officer 'Niigaki' (He fell in love with Yoko at first sight.)
 Mitsuru Hirata as the Principal
 Hideko Yoshida as Social Insurance Agency's Staff

References

External links

2007 films
Kadokawa Daiei Studio films
Films set in Okinawa Prefecture
Films based on Japanese novels
Films scored by Michiru Ōshima
2000s Japanese films